The term human blood group systems is defined by the International Society of Blood Transfusion (ISBT) as systems in the human species where cell-surface antigens—in particular, those on blood cells—are "controlled at a single gene locus or by two or more very closely linked homologous genes with little or no observable recombination between them", and include the common ABO and Rh (Rhesus) antigen systems, as well as many others; 43 human systems are identified .

Table of systems and classifications

Antibodies
Following is a comparison of clinically relevant characteristics of antibodies against the main human blood group systems:

Compatibility testing

Blood compatibility testing is performed before blood transfusion, including matching of the ABO blood group system and the Rh blood group system, as well as screening for recipient antibodies against other human blood group systems. Blood compatibility testing is also routinely performed on pregnant women and on the cord blood from newborn babies, because incompatibility puts the baby at risk for developing hemolytic disease of the newborn. It is also used before hematopoietic stem cell transplantation, as it may be responsible for some cases of acute graft-versus-host disease.

Other human blood group systems than ABO and Rh have a relatively small risk of complications when blood is mixed. Therefore, in emergencies such as major hemorrhage, the urgency of transfusion can exceed the need for compatibility testing against other blood group systems (and potentially Rh as well). Also, blood compatibility testing beyond ABO and Rh is generally limited to antibody detection (not necessarily including forward typing). Still, in Europe, females who require blood transfusions are often typed for the K and extended Rh antigens to prevent sensitization to these antigens, which could put them at risk for developing hemolytic disease of the newborn during pregnancy.

When needing to give red blood cell transfusion to a patient, the presence of clinically significant antibodies produced by the patient can be detected by mixing patient serum with 2 to 4 "screening" or "control" red blood cells that together display essentially all relevant antigens. If any of these mixes display a reaction (evidence of patient antibodies binding to the screening red blood cells), a more extensive antibody panel is warranted (as imaged at right).

References

Further reading
 
 
 ISBT Table of blood group antigens within systems, updated August 2008.
 BGMUT Blood Group Antigen Gene Mutation Database  at NCBI, NIH.

External links
 BGvar, a comprehensive online resource for blood group associated genetic variants.- 
 

Blood antigen systems
Transfusion medicine